Katha prabana is a moth of the family Erebidae first described by Frederic Moore in 1859. It is found on the Sula Islands, Borneo, Sumatra, Java, Bali, Sulawesi, the Moluccas and in Myanmar. The habitat consists of lowland areas.

Adults are mostly dark blackish grey, with a narrow pale yellow forewing costa.

References

Moths described in 1859
Lithosiina